Mosè Piccio (Hebrew: משה בן יוסף פיגו, Moshe ben Yosef Figu; d. 1576) was an Ottoman lexicographer. Piccio compiled Zikhron Torat Moshe (Hebrew: זכרון תורת משה), which is a dictionary of aggadic terminology first published in Constantinople in 1552. The dictionary's content reflects the impact of the massive migrations taking place at that time around the Mediterranean Basin.

References

Lexicographers from the Ottoman Empire
Year of birth unknown
1576 deaths
Mose
People from Edirne
Sephardi Jews from the Ottoman Empire
16th-century rabbis from the Ottoman Empire
16th-century writers from the Ottoman Empire
16th-century Sephardi Jews
Jewish lexicographers